The white-winged becard (Pachyramphus polychopterus) is a species of bird in the family Tityridae. It has traditionally been placed in Cotingidae or Tyrannidae, but evidence strongly suggest it is better placed in Tityridae, where it is now placed by the South American Classification Committee. The species contains 8 subspecies that vary markedly in plumage and voice, and it has been suggested that they represent more than one species.

It is found in Argentina, Belize, Bolivia, Brazil, Colombia, Costa Rica, Ecuador, French Guiana, Guatemala, Guyana, Honduras, Mexico, Nicaragua, Panama, Paraguay, Peru, Suriname, Trinidad and Tobago, Uruguay, and Venezuela. Chile is the only country of South America where the white-winged becard does not occur. The white-winged becard ranges east of the Andes cordillera, except in Colombia and Ecuador.

References

Further reading

External links
White-winged becard videos on the Internet Bird Collection
White-winged becard photo gallery VIREO Photo-High Res
Photo; Article www.ib.usp.br–"Tityridae"
Photo-High Res; Article neomorphus

white-winged becard
Birds of Costa Rica
Birds of Panama
Birds of South America
Birds of Trinidad and Tobago
white-winged becard
Birds of the Amazon Basin
Birds of Brazil
Taxa named by Louis Jean Pierre Vieillot
Taxonomy articles created by Polbot